Abd Allah ibn Ahmad ibn Muhammad Asfara'ni, also written Esfarayeni, known as Abu Bakr was a Persian physician from Esfarayen, North Khorasan, Iran. 
 
Little is known of this scientist.

His treatise, entitled Zubdat al-bayan fi ‘ilm al-abdah ("The Best Explanation in the Science of Bodies"), is preserved in a unique copy now in the collections of The National Library of Medicine. No other copy of the treatise is recorded and the author is otherwise unknown. The copy of the treatise is undated, but it appears to have been copied by the same scribe who finished copying another treatise in the volume on 22 Dhu al-Hijjah 1241AH (i.e. 28 July 1826). Therefore, the only statement that can be made with certainty is that the author was active before 1826.

See also
List of Iranian scientists

References

19th-century Iranian physicians